The Benedict–Webb–Rubin equation (BWR), named after Manson Benedict, G. B. Webb, and L. C. Rubin, is an equation of state used in fluid dynamics. Working at the research laboratory of the M. W. Kellogg Company, the three researchers rearranged the Beattie–Bridgeman equation of state and increased the number of experimentally determined constants to eight.

The original BWR equation

,
where  is the molar density.

The BWRS equation of state
A modification of the Benedict–Webb–Rubin equation of state by Professor Kenneth E. Starling of the University of Oklahoma:

,

where  is the molar density. The 11 mixture parameters (etc.) are calculated using the following relations

Values of the various parameters for 15 substances can be found in Starling's Fluid Properties for Light Petroleum Systems..

The modified BWR equation (mBWR)

A further modification of the Benedict–Webb–Rubin equation of state by Jacobsen and Stewart:

where:

The mBWR equation subsequently evolved into a 32 term version (Younglove and Ely, 1987) with numerical parameters determined by fitting the equation to empirical data for a reference fluid.  Other fluids then are described by using reduced variables for temperature and density.

See also
 Real gas

References

Further reading

.

Equations of fluid dynamics